The Oakland Raiders were a professional American football team that played in Oakland from its founding in 1960 to 1981 and again from 1995 to 2019 before relocating to the Las Vegas metropolitan area where they now play as the Las Vegas Raiders. Between 1982 and 1994, the team played in Los Angeles as the Los Angeles Raiders.

The team's first home game was at Kezar Stadium in San Francisco, against the Houston Oilers on September 11, 1960, with a 37-22 loss. They played their last game as an Oakland-based club on December 29, 2019, a game which they lost 16-15 to make them finish 3rd in the AFC West, eliminate them from playoff contention, and suffer a late-season collapse after starting with a 6-4 record.

Early years (1960–1962)

A few months after the inaugural American Football League draft in 1959, the owners of the yet-unnamed Minneapolis franchise accepted an offer to join the established National Football League as an expansion team (now called the Minnesota Vikings) in 1961, sending the AFL scrambling for a replacement. At the time, Oakland seemed an unlikely venue for a professional football team. The city had not asked for a team, there was no ownership group and there was no stadium in Oakland suitable for pro football (the closest stadiums were in Berkeley and San Francisco) and there was already a successful NFL franchise in the Bay Area in the San Francisco 49ers. However, the AFL owners selected Oakland after Los Angeles Chargers owner Barron Hilton threatened to forfeit his franchise unless a second team was placed on the West Coast. Accordingly, the city of Oakland was awarded the eighth AFL franchise on January 30, 1960, and the team inherited the Minneapolis club's draft picks.

Upon receiving the franchise, a meeting of local civic leaders and businessmen was called, chaired by former United States Senator William Fife Knowland, editor of the Oakland Tribune; Edgar Kaiser of Kaiser Steel; developer Robert T. Nahas; and Oakland City Councilman Robert Osborne. Also attending the meeting were Oakland Mayor Clifford E. Rishell; City Councilmen Frank J. Youell, Felix Chialvo, Glenn E. Hoover, Fred Maggiora, John C. Houlihan, Dan Marovich, and Howard E. Rilea; Alameda County Board of Supervisors President Kent D. Pursel; and County Supervisors Emanuel P. Razeto, Leland W. Sweeney, and Francis Dunn. The gathering found a number of businessmen willing to invest in the new team. A limited partnership was formed to own the team headed by managing general partner Y. Charles (Chet) Soda, a local real estate developer, and included general partners Ed McGah, Oakland City Councilman Robert Osborne, F. Wayne Valley, restaurateur Harvey Binns, 1928 Olympic gold medalist Donald Blessing, and contractor Charles Harney, the builder of San Francisco's Candlestick Park, built on a bleak parcel of land he owned; the road leading to the stadium is known as Harney Way.

A "name the team" contest was held by the Oakland Tribune, and the winner was announced April 4, 1960 as the Oakland Señors. After a few days of being the butt of local jokes (and accusations that the contest was fixed, as Soda was fairly well known within the Oakland business community for calling his acquaintances "señor"), the fledgling team (and its owners) changed the team's name nine days later to the Oakland Raiders, which had finished third in the naming contest. The original team colors were black, gold and white. The now-familiar team emblem of a pirate (or "raider") wearing a football helmet was created, reportedly a rendition of actor Randolph Scott.

Oakland Raiders games were broadcast locally on KNBC (680 AM; the station later became KNBR), with Bud (Wilson Keene) Foster handling play-by-play and Mel Venter providing color analysis. Foster, the "Voice of the California Golden Bears", had a long career in radio, 1945–1955 as the "Voice of the Oakland Oaks" of the defunct Pacific Coast League; Foster was the first 1946–49, 1951–53, "Voice of the San Francisco 49ers". After the 1962 season, Foster would only call CAL (University of California at Berkeley) football until his retirement. Raider games, 1963–65 were heard on KDIA 1410 AM, with Bob Blum and Dan Galvin. In 1966. KGO Radio 810 signed a contract with the Oakland Raiders. Bill King was hired for the play-by-play and Scotty Stirling (an Oakland Tribune sportswriter) was color commentator.

1960

When the University of California refused to let the Raiders play home games at Memorial Stadium in Berkeley, they chose Kezar Stadium in San Francisco as their home field. The team's first regular season home game was played on September 11, 1960, a 37–22 loss to the Houston Oilers.

The Raiders were allowed to move to Candlestick Park for the final three home games of the 1960 season after gaining the approval of San Francisco's Recreation and Park Commission, marking the first time that professional football would be played at the new stadium. The change of venue however failed to attract larger crowds for the Raiders during their time at Candlestick Park, with announced attendance of 12,061 (vs. the Chargers in a 41–17 loss on December 4), 9,037 (vs. the New York Titans in a 31–28 loss on December 11) and 7,000 (estimated, vs. the Broncos in a 48–10 victory to close out the season on December 17) at Candlestick.

The Raiders finished their first campaign with a 6–8 record, and lost $500,000. Desperately in need of money to continue running the team, Valley received a $400,000 loan from Buffalo Bills founder Ralph C. Wilson Jr.

1961–1962
After the conclusion of the first season Soda dropped out of the partnership, and on January 17, 1961, Valley, McGah and Osborne bought out the remaining four general partners. Soon after, Valley and McGah purchased Osborne's interest, with Valley named as the managing general partner. After splitting the previous home season between Kezar and Candlestick, the Raiders moved exclusively to Candlestick Park in 1961, where total attendance for the season was about 50,000, and finished 2–12. Valley threatened to move the Raiders out of the area unless a stadium was built in Oakland, but in 1962 the Raiders moved into 18,000-seat Frank Youell Field (later expanded to 22,000 seats), their first home in Oakland. It was a temporary home for the team while the Oakland–Alameda County Coliseum was under construction. Under Marty Feldman and Red Conkright—the team's second and third head coaches since entering the AFL—the Raiders finished 1–13 in 1962, losing their first 13 games (and making for a 19–game losing streak from 1961 and 1962) before winning the season finale, and attendance remained low.

Oakland, the AFL, and Al Davis (1963–1969)

1963–1966
After the 1962 season, Valley hired Al Davis, a former assistant coach of the San Diego Chargers, as head coach and general manager. At 33, he was the youngest person in over 30 years to hold the position of head coach, and the youngest person ever to hold the position of general manager, in professional football. Davis immediately changed the team colors to silver and black, and began to implement what he termed the "vertical game", an aggressive offensive strategy based on the West Coast offense developed by Chargers head coach Sid Gillman. Under Davis the Raiders improved to 10–4, and he was named the AFL's Coach of the Year in 1963. Though the team slipped to 5–7–2 in 1964, it rebounded to an 8–5–1 record in 1965. He also initiated the use of team slogans such as "Pride and Poise", "Commitment to Excellence", and "Just Win, Baby"—all of which are registered trademarks.

In April 1966, Davis left the Raiders after being named AFL Commissioner. Two months later, the league announced its merger with the NFL. With the merger, the position of commissioner was no longer needed, and Davis entered into discussions with Valley about returning to the Raiders. On July 25, 1966, Davis returned as part-owner of the team. He purchased a 10 percent interest in the team for US$18,000, and became the team's third general partner — the partner in charge of football operations.

1967–1969
On the field, the team Davis had assembled and coached steadily improved. With John Rauch (Davis's hand-picked successor) as head coach, the Raiders won the 1967 AFL Championship, defeating the Houston Oilers 40–7. The win earned the team a trip to Super Bowl II, where they were beaten 33–14 by Vince Lombardi's Green Bay Packers. The following two years, the Raiders again won Western Division titles, only to lose the AFL Championship to the eventual Super Bowl winners—the New York Jets (1968) and Kansas City Chiefs (1969).

John Madden becomes head coach
In 1969, John Madden became the team's sixth head coach, and under him the Raiders became one of the most successful franchises in the NFL, winning six division titles during the 1970s. It was during this period that the Raiders forged an image as a team of tough, take-no-prisoners players—such as future Hall of Fame offensive linemen Jim Otto, Gene Upshaw, and Art Shell; linebacker Ted (“the Stork”) Hendricks; defensive end Ben Davidson; and cornerback Willie Brown—who would occasionally cross the line into dirty play. Those teams also featured an additional foursome of future Hall of Fame players in tight end Dave Casper, kicker George Blanda, and wide receiver Fred Biletnikoff, as well as fiery quarterback Ken ("the Snake") Stabler.

AFL–NFL merger and era of success (1970–1981)

1970–1971

In 1970, the AFL–NFL merger took place and the Raiders became part of the Western Division of the American Football Conference in the newly merged NFL. The first post-merger season saw the Raiders win the AFC West with an 8–4–2 record and go all the way to the conference championship, where they lost to the Colts. Despite another 8–4–2 season in 1971, the Raiders failed to win the division or achieve a playoff berth.

1972–1978
In 1972, with Wayne Valley out of the country for several weeks attending the Olympic Games in Munich, Davis's attorneys drafted a revised partnership agreement that gave him total control over all of the Raiders' operations. McGah, a supporter of Davis, signed the agreement. Under partnership law, by a 2–1 vote of the general partners, the new agreement was thus ratified. Valley was furious when he discovered this, and immediately filed suit to have the new agreement overturned, but the court sided with Davis and McGah. That year would see the team achieve a 10–3–1 record and another division title. In the divisional round of the playoffs, they were beaten by the Steelers 13–7 on a play that would later be known as the Immaculate Reception.

With a record of 9–4–1 in 1973, the Raiders reached the AFC Championship, but lost 27–10 to the Dolphins.

In 1974, Oakland had a 12–2 regular season, which included a nine-game winning streak. They beat the Dolphins in the divisional round of the playoffs in a see-saw battle before falling to the Steelers in the AFC Championship. The playoff game against the Dolphins is known in NFL lore as the Sea of Hands game in which running back Clarence Davis caught a late 4th-quarter touchdown amid three Miami defenders to win 28–26 and end the Dolphins' chances of a three-peat and a fourth consecutive Super Bowl appearance.

In the 1975 season opener, the Raiders beat Miami and ended the Dolphins' 31-game home winning streak. With an 11–3 record, they defeated Cincinnati in the divisional playoff round, but again fell to the Steelers in the conference championship.

In 1976, Valley sold his interest in the team, and Davis — who now owned only 25 percent of the Raiders — was firmly in charge. The Raiders beat Pittsburgh in a revenge match on the season opener and continued to cement their reputation for hard, dirty play by knocking WR Lynn Swann out for two weeks in a helmet-to-helmet collision. Al Davis later tried to sue Steelers coach Chuck Noll for libel after the latter called safety George Atkinson a criminal for the hit. The Raiders won 13 regular season games and a close victory over New England (the only team to beat them in the regular season) in the first round of the playoffs. They then knocked out the injury-plagued Steelers in the AFC Championship to go to Super Bowl XI. Oakland's opponent was the Minnesota Vikings, a team that had lost three previous Super Bowls. The Raiders led 16–0 at halftime. By the end, forcing their opponent into multiple turnovers, they won 32–14 for their first post-merger championship.

The following season saw the Raiders finish 11–3, but lose the division title to 12–2 Denver. They settled for a wild card playoff berth, beating the Colts 37–31 in two overtime periods, but then falling to the Broncos 20–17 in the AFC Championship.

During a 1978 preseason game, Patriots WR Darryl Stingley was tragically injured by a hit from Raiders FS Jack Tatum and was left paralyzed for life. Although the Raiders achieved a winning record at 9–7, they failed to qualify for the playoffs.

1979–1981

After ten consecutive winning seasons and one Super Bowl championship, John Madden left the Raiders (and coaching) in 1979 to pursue a career as a television football commentator. His replacement was former Raiders quarterback Tom Flores, the first Hispanic head coach in NFL history. Flores led the Raiders to another 9–7 season, but not the playoffs.

The following off-season, the popular gun-slinging quarterback Ken Stabler was traded to the Houston Oilers, a move which was unpopular and criticized at the time. In the fifth week of the 1980 season, starting quarterback Dan Pastorini broke his leg and was replaced by former number-one draft pick Jim Plunkett. Plunkett led Oakland to an 11–5 record and a wild card berth. After playoff victories against the Houston Oilers, Cleveland Browns, and San Diego Chargers, the Raiders went to Super Bowl XV, and clinched their second NFL championship in five years with a 27–10 win over the favored Philadelphia Eagles in Super Bowl XV. With the victory, the Raiders became the first ever wild card team to win a Super Bowl. Two Super Bowl records of note occurred in this game: 1) Kenny King's 80-yard, first-quarter, catch-and-run reception from Jim Plunkett remained the longest touchdown Super Bowl pass play for the next 16 years; and 2) Rod Martin's three interceptions of Eagles' quarterback Ron Jaworski still stands today as a Super Bowl record. Reflecting on the last ten years during the post-game awards ceremony, Al Davis stated "...this was our finest hour, this was the finest hour in the history of the Oakland Raiders. To Tom Flores, the coaches, and the athletes: you were magnificent out there, you really were."

The team would not see a repeat performance in 1981, falling to 7–9 and a losing record for the first time since 1964.

Los Angeles era (1982–1994)

Prior to the 1980 season, Al Davis attempted unsuccessfully to have improvements made to the Oakland–Alameda County Coliseum, specifically the addition of luxury boxes. On March 1, he signed a memorandum of agreement to move the Raiders from Oakland to Los Angeles. The move, which required three-fourths approval by league owners, was defeated 22–0 (with five owners abstaining). When Davis tried to move the team anyway, he was blocked by an injunction. In response, the Raiders not only became an active partner in an antitrust lawsuit filed by the Los Angeles Memorial Coliseum (who had recently lost the Los Angeles Rams), but filed an antitrust lawsuit of their own. After the first case was declared a mistrial, in May 1982 a second jury found in favor of Davis and the Los Angeles Coliseum, clearing the way for the move. With the ruling, the Raiders finally relocated to Los Angeles for the 1982 season to play their home games at the Los Angeles Coliseum.

Back in Oakland (1995–2019)
On June 23, 1995, Davis signed a letter of intent to move the Raiders back to Oakland. The move was approved by the Alameda County Board of Supervisors the next month, as well as by the NFL. The move was greeted with much fanfare, and under new head coach Mike White the 1995 season started off well for the team. Oakland started 8–2, but injuries to starting quarterback Jeff Hostetler contributed to a six-game losing streak to end the season, and the Raiders failed to qualify for the playoffs for a second consecutive season. As part of the agreement to bring the Raiders back to Oakland the city agreed that they would increase the capacity of the Coliseum. The result was a structure of 20,000 capacity seating that became known as Mount Davis after Davis. The structure was completed in time for the 1996 season.

Gruden era (1998–2001)
After two more unsuccessful seasons (7-9 in 1996 and 4–12 in 1997) under White and his successor, Joe Bugel, Davis selected a new head coach from outside the Raiders organization for only the second time when he hired Philadelphia Eagles offensive coordinator Jon Gruden, who previously worked for the 49ers and Packers under head coach Mike Holmgren. Under Gruden, the Raiders posted consecutive 8–8 seasons in 1998 and 1999, and climbed out of last place in the AFC West. Oakland finished 12–4 in the 2000 season, the team's most successful in a decade. Led by veteran quarterback Rich Gannon, Oakland won their first division title since 1990, and advanced to the AFC Championship, where they lost 16–3 to the eventual Super Bowl champion Baltimore Ravens.

The Raiders acquired all-time leading receiver Jerry Rice prior to the 2001 season. They finished 10-6 and won a second straight AFC West title but lost their divisional-round playoff game to the eventual Super Bowl champion New England Patriots, in a controversial game that became known as the "Tuck Rule Game". The game was played in a heavy snowstorm, and late in the fourth quarter an apparent fumble by Patriots quarterback Tom Brady was recovered by Raiders linebacker Greg Biekert. The recovery would have led to a Raiders victory, however the play was reviewed and determined to be an incomplete pass (it was ruled that Brady had pump faked and then "tucked" the ball into his body, which, by rule, cannot result in a fumble – though this explanation was not given on the field, but after the NFL season had ended). The Patriots retained possession of the ball, and drove for a game-tying field goal. The game went into overtime and the Patriots won, 16–13.

Callahan era and Super Bowl XXXVII appearance (2002–2003)
Shortly after the 2001 season, the Raiders made an unusual move that involved releasing Gruden from his contract and allowing the Tampa Bay Buccaneers to sign him. In return, the Raiders received cash and future draft picks from the Buccaneers. The sudden move came after months of speculation in the media that Davis and Gruden had fallen out with each other both personally and professionally. Bill Callahan, who served as the team's offensive coordinator and offensive line coach during Gruden's tenure, was named head coach.

Under Callahan, the Raiders finished the 2002 season 11–5, won their third straight division title, and clinched the top seed in the playoffs. Rich Gannon was named MVP of the NFL after passing for a league-high 4,689 yards. After beating the New York Jets and Tennessee Titans by large margins in the playoffs, the Raiders made their fifth Super Bowl appearance in Super Bowl XXXVII. Their opponent was the Tampa Bay Buccaneers, coached by Gruden. The Raiders, who had not made significant changes to Gruden's offensive schemes, were intercepted five times by the Buccaneers en route to a 48–21 blowout. Some Tampa Bay players claimed that Gruden had given them so much information on Oakland's offense, they knew exactly what plays were being called.

Callahan's second season as head coach was considerably less successful. Oakland finished 4–12, their worst showing since 1997. After a late-season loss to the Denver Broncos, a visibly frustrated Callahan exclaimed, "We've got to be the dumbest team in America in terms of playing the game." At the end of the 2003 regular season, Callahan was fired and replaced by former Washington Redskins head coach Norv Turner.

Coaching carousel and consecutive eleven-loss seasons (2004–2009)
The team's fortunes did not improve in Turner's first year. Oakland finished the 2004 season 5–11, with only one divisional win (a one-point victory over the Broncos in Denver). During a Week 3 victory against the Buccaneers, Rich Gannon suffered a neck injury that ended his season and eventually his career; he never returned to the team and retired before the 2005 season. Kerry Collins, who led the New York Giants to an appearance in Super Bowl XXXV and signed with Oakland after the 2003 season, became the team's starting quarterback.

In an effort to bolster their offense, in early 2005 the Raiders acquired Pro Bowl wide receiver Randy Moss via trade with the Minnesota Vikings, and signed free agent running back Lamont Jordan of the New York Jets. After a 4–12 season and a second consecutive last-place finish, Turner was fired as head coach. On February 11, 2006, the team announced the return of Art Shell as head coach. In announcing the move, Al Davis said that firing Shell in 1995 had been a mistake.

Under Shell, the Raiders lost their first five games in 2006 en route to a 2–14 finish, the team's worst record since 1962. Oakland's offense struggled greatly, scoring just 168 points (fewest in franchise history) and allowing a league-high 72 sacks. Wide receiver Jerry Porter was benched by Shell for most of the season in what many viewed as a personal, rather than football-related, decision. The Raiders also earned the right to the first overall pick in the 2007 NFL Draft for the first time since 1962, by virtue of having the league's worst record.

One season into his second run as head coach, Shell was fired on January 4, 2007. On January 22, the team announced the hiring of 31-year-old USC offensive coordinator Lane Kiffin, the youngest coach in franchise history and the youngest coach in the NFL. In the 2007 NFL Draft, the Raiders selected LSU quarterback JaMarcus Russell with the #1 overall pick. Kiffin coached the Raiders to a 4–12 record in the 2007 season. After a 1–3 start to 2008 and months of speculation and rumors, Al Davis fired Kiffin on September 30, 2008. Tom Cable was named as his interim replacement, and officially signed as the 17th head coach of the Oakland Raiders on February 3, 2009.

Their finish to the 2008 season would turn out to match their best since they lost the Super Bowl in the 2002 season. However, they still finished 5–11 and ended up third in the AFC West, the first time they did not finish last since 2002. They produced an identical record in 2009; however, the season was somewhat ameliorated by the fact that four of the Raiders' five wins were against opponents with above-.500 records. At the end of their 2009 campaign, the Raiders became the first team in NFL history to lose at least 11 games in seven straight seasons.

Al Davis's final years (2010–2011)
In 2010, the Raiders had a better draft than those of the previous years and also cut Jamarcus Russell in May after he showed up to minicamp overweight. Replacing him as starting quarterback was Jason Campbell, traded from Washington. The outlook for the team improved, but it was not apparent after they opened by suffering a 38–13 rout in Tennessee. Returning to Oakland, the Raiders defeated St. Louis and then lost a 21–20 game in Arizona. After a home loss to Houston, they beat their division rival Chargers 35–27 for the first time in seven years, and then lost the "Battle of the Bay" to San Francisco. The Week 7 game in Denver set records as the Raiders defeated their division rival with eight touchdowns (two passing, five rushing, and one interception return), setting a score of 59–14 for the most points in franchise history. After beating Seattle 33–3 and then Kansas City 23–20 for a third straight win, the Raiders went into their bye week with a winning 5–4 record.

However, after the bye week, the Raiders fell to Pittsburgh and Miami before beating San Diego and losing to the Jaguars. A home win over Denver in Week 15 saw the team approach a playoff spot, but faltered in a loss to the Colts which ensured that they would miss the postseason for the 8th straight year. By beating Kansas City in Week 17, the Raiders became the first team in NFL history to sweep their division and still not make the playoffs.

Despite beginning to turn the team around, Tom Cable was fired by Al Davis soon after the season ended for remarking "I finally began to feel that we weren't losers." Davis then promoted offensive coordinator Hue Jackson to the head coaching position in his first public appearance since November 2009. The physically frail, but still sharp Davis explained his decision to fire Cable by saying "If .500 isn't losing, then I don't know what losing is." Some critics also argued that the Raiders failed to win a single game outside their own division or the weak NFC West.

During all this time, Al Davis, who was now past his 80th birthday and in increasingly poor health, refused to hire a general manager or relinquish his absolute control of the team's on-field activities and he continued to make all major decisions regarding draft picks, trades, or signings himself. He came under fire both for this and for strategies that were out-of-step with the contemporary NFL, in particular, his attempt to recreate the vertical game used by Daryl Lamonica and Jim Plunkett. Jamarcus Russell was drafted due to Davis's assumption that he had the proper physical traits needed for this style of play. The signing of Randy Moss in 2005 also proved a costly mistake that consumed large portions of salary cap space.

The Raiders' biggest off-season moves were trading quarterback Bruce Gradkowski to Cincinnati and cornerback Nnamdi Asomugha to Philadelphia. With their new coach in place, the team opened 2011 in Denver for their first prime-time appearance in three years. On a rain-slicked Monday night, Oakland won an extremely sloppy game 23–20 after repeated penalties and Broncos mistakes. Kicker Sebastian Janikowski also booted a 63-yard field goal for only the third time in NFL history. In Week 2, the Raiders lost a wild shootout match in Buffalo 38–35, beat the Jets 34–24, and then lost to New England 31–19 for a 2–2 start.

After flying to Houston for a match with the Texans, the Raiders were stunned by the news that Al Davis had died at his home on October 8 after having been with the franchise for all but its first three years of existence. A last-second interception from Texans quarterback Matt Schaub allowed the Raiders to win that game, but in the next week's match with Cleveland (a 24–17 win), Jason Campbell sustained a season-ending collarbone fracture. With backups Kyle Boller and Terrell Pryor considered unsuitable to replace him, the Raiders made a desperation bid with Cincinnati to acquire quarterback Carson Palmer, who had retired after a feud with that team, but was still under contract with them. With Al Davis's passing, Hue Jackson was effectively in charge of all on-field decisions and he finally convinced Bengals owner Mike Brown to give up Palmer in exchange for all of Oakland's first-round draft picks. The deal thus having been made, Palmer stood under center as the Raiders hosted Kansas City in Week 7. But the team lost as Kyle Boller threw three interceptions to open the game while Palmer replaced him early in the second half. However, he also threw three interceptions, losing 28–0.

With the AFC West extremely weak, the Raiders vacillated between 3rd and 1st place as the season progressed. A three-game losing streak in December badly harmed their playoff chances, but up to Week 17, they remained in contention to clinch the division. However, the Raiders lost a must-win game at home to San Diego and so for the ninth year in a row failed to make the playoffs or produce a winning record.

The Dennis Allen years (2012–14)
Despite rumors of selling the team, Al Davis's family indicated that they would retain ownership. At the conclusion of the 2011 season, Hue Jackson was fired and replaced by former Broncos defensive coordinator Dennis Allen, the first defensive-minded Raiders head coach since John Madden. At Davis's death, the once-elite franchise was a mess, with one of the NFL's oldest rosters, almost no salary cap space, and valuable first-round draft picks squandered on bust players and Carson Palmer. Surveys of players across the league consistently showed that the Raiders had become one of the least desirable teams to play for. In addition, with the Miami Marlins obtaining their own ballpark in 2012, the Raiders became the last team in the NFL to still share a stadium with a baseball franchise. The baseball infield for the Oakland Athletics at the Oakland Coliseum was present during Raiders games during the early NFL seasons. The end of the MLB season correlated with the beginning of the NFL season, which forced the Raiders to play certain games on a dirt field.

The Raiders began 2012 by losing a very poorly executed home opener on Monday Night Football to San Diego 22–14. The team was plagued by fumbles and dropped passes, and did not score a touchdown until near the end. On the bright side, defensive performance was decent and helped contain the Chargers' passing game.

After another miserable loss in Miami, the Raiders returned home to take on Pittsburgh in Week 3. In the 4th quarter, trailing by 10, wide receiver Darrius Heyward-Bey collided with Pittsburgh safety Ryan Mundy and was knocked out of the game. The loss of Heyward-Bey inspired the rest of the team, which rallied to tie the game 31-31, and with 4 seconds left, Sebastian Janikowski kicked a 43-yard field goal to win the game 34–31. In the end though, the Raiders finished the 2012 season 4–12.

During 2013, there was little apparent sign of improvement as the Raiders once again finished 4–12, including a particularly embarrassing loss to the Eagles in Week 9 when quarterback Nick Foles threw a record seven touchdown passes. In Week 15, they gave up 56 points to the Chiefs.

In 2014, Dennis Allen was fired after a 0–4 start and replaced by former Dolphins head coach and then-Raiders offensive line coach Tony Sparano for the remainder of the season. They became the first team to be mathematically eliminated from playoff contention and were guaranteed a fourth-place finish in the AFC West after a loss in Week 11 dropped them to 0–10. The Raiders were the last team in the league that year to win a game, finally doing so the next week against their division rival, the Kansas City Chiefs, but they were defeated 52–0 by the Rams the next week. The Raiders did manage to defeat their geographic rival, the San Francisco 49ers, and defeated Buffalo in Week 16, which mathematically eliminated the Bills from playoff contention for the 15th straight year. Oakland's final record that season was 3–13. Their offense struggled mightily, averaging just 282.2 yards per game (last in the league). Quarterback and second-round pick Derek Carr proved to be a positive addition, serving as the starter for the entire season and set a Raiders record for most passing yards in one season by a rookie. Also, linebacker Khalil Mack, selected in the first round, had 75 tackles and 4 sacks.

Jack Del Rio, Los Angeles, and Las Vegas (2015–17)

On January 14, 2015, Jack Del Rio, the then-Denver Broncos defensive coordinator and former Jacksonville Jaguars head coach, was hired by the Oakland Raiders to be their new head coach. Del Rio's new coaching staff included former Minnesota Vikings offensive coordinator Bill Musgrave as offensive coordinator and former Vikings head coach Mike Tice as offensive line coach; both had worked with Del Rio at the Jaguars in the past.

On February 19, 2015, the Raiders and the Chargers announced that they would build a privately financed $1.78 billion stadium in Carson, California if they were to move to the Los Angeles market. Both teams stated that they would continue to attempt to get stadiums built in their respective cities.

The Raiders secured the #4 pick in the 2015 NFL draft, which was used on receiver Amari Cooper. The Raiders finished 7–9 in 2015, showing noticeable improvement over the previous season.

On January 4, 2016, the Raiders filed for relocation alongside the Chargers and Rams.

The Committee set up by the league to deal with Los Angeles initially recommended the Carson Site, but the Chargers and Raiders were unable to secure the votes they needed to move. After hours of debate, the league voted to allow the St. Louis Rams to move on January 12, 2016, with the San Diego Chargers having the option to join them within a year. Davis then turned his attention to Las Vegas.

In 2016, the team finished 12–4, finally making the postseason for the first time since 2002 with strong play on both offense and defense, but lost Derek Carr and backup Matt McGloin to season-ending injuries to close out the year. The Raiders were unable to win their first playoff game since 2002, falling to the Houston Texans 14–27 in a game in which third-string quarterback Connor Cook threw one touchdown and three interceptions. Musgrave was let go following the playoff loss.

After over 10 years of failure to secure a new stadium in Oakland to replace the decaying coliseum (issues of which include sewage backups and flooding) and after missing out on Los Angeles, on March 27, 2017, the NFL granted the team permission to relocate to Las Vegas, Nevada, pending the new Allegiant Stadium's completion. The Raiders soon announced plans to stay in Oakland until the new stadium was completed in 2020. Ground was officially broken on the new stadium on November 13, 2017.

Following a season-ending 4-game losing streak to finish 6–10 in 2017, in addition to a regression of the offense under Todd Downing, Del Rio was fired by Mark Davis.

Return of Jon Gruden and the end of the Oakland Raiders (2018–2019)
In January 2018, the Raiders re-hired Jon Gruden, signing him to a 10-year, $100-million contract, paying him $10 million a year and giving him near-total control over the team. The Raiders traded away Khalil Mack and Amari Cooper in separate deals, acquiring three first-round draft picks in the process. The Raiders finished 4–12 in Gruden's first season back with the team. On December 10, the Raiders fired general manager Reggie McKenzie, who had been with the Raiders since 2012.

In the 2019 off-season, the Raiders acquired receiver Antonio Brown from the Pittsburgh Steelers via trade following Brown's falling out with the Steelers, only to release him after a chaotic preseason culminating with Brown getting into a heated argument with new general manager Mike Mayock. The Raiders finished the 2019 season with a 7–9 record and lost their last game at the Oakland Coliseum to the Jacksonville Jaguars 20–16, giving up a late touchdown in the closing seconds.

On January 22, 2020, the team was officially renamed the Las Vegas Raiders and the relocation was completed in the following months.

See also
 History of the Los Angeles Raiders
 History of the Las Vegas Raiders

References

Oakland
History of Oakland, California